Vespasiano Colonna (c. 1485 – 13 March 1528) was an Italian nobleman and condottiero, a member of the Colonna family.

Biography
He was the son of Prospero Colonna, duke of Traetto (modern Minturno) and count of Fondi, and Covella di Sanseverino.

He fought for the imperial side in the Italian Wars; in 1524, in reward, he obtained by Charles V the county of Belgioioso, confiscated from the Barbiano family. Sent to defend the Spanish-controlled Kingdom of Naples, he however defected to the French in 1525, gaining Pope Clement V's enmity. After the Colonna had occupied Anagni, the Pope proposed to pardon him in exchange of stopping fighting against the papal lands: Colonna replied assaulting the papal palace in the Vatican City, forcing the pope to take shelter in Castel Sant'Angelo. Vespasiano and all his parents were therefore excommunicated.

In 1527 he was reconciled with the pope thanks to the intercession of imperial ministers.

He died at Paliano in 1528.

Family
Colonna first married Beatrice Appiani of Piombino, with whom he had a daughter, Isabella Colonna. In 1526 he remarried to Giulia Gonzaga, daughter of Ludovico Gonzaga duke of Sabbioneta.

Sources

 Franca Petrucci: Dizionario Biografico degli Italiani, vol. XXVII (1982).
 Società Genealogica Italiana: Libro d´oro della nobiltà mediterranea, (2014).

1480s births
1528 deaths
Vespasiano
16th-century condottieri
People temporarily excommunicated by the Catholic Church
People from the Province of Latina